The 1970 Duke Blue Devils football team represented Duke University during the 1970 NCAA University Division football season.

Schedule

Roster

References

Duke
Duke Blue Devils football seasons
Duke Blue Devils football